Anjaane: The Unknown is a 2005 Bollywood horror film. The main cast is Manisha Koirala, Sanjay Kapoor, Tejaswini Kolhapure and Helen.

The film was directed by Harry W. Fernandes and is based on Alejandro Amenábar's film The Others.

Synopsis
Shivani and Aditya, a married couple with 2 children. They are wealthy and live in a mansion. Their idyllic life is shattered with the arrival of Sonia, who has an affair with Aditya. Eventually, Aditya leaves his family for Sonia, leaving the wife and two kids alone. When it is found out that Sonia is barren, Aditya demands custody of his children from Shivani and approaches the courts for a custody battle. Eventually, the courts rule against Shivani and award custody to Aditya and Sonia. The movie changes its ambiance from the family dispute to one of suspense and horror shortly after.

Cast
 Manisha Koirala as Shivani
 Sanjay Kapoor as Aditya Malhotra
 Tejaswini Kolhapure as Sonia
 Helen
 Tanwi Gouri Mehta
 Anand Mehta
 Ekta Jain as Lawyer

Soundtrack

"Kis Kadar Chahate Hai Ham Tumko Sanam" - Alka Yagnik, Jayesh Gandhi
"De Do Re De Do" - Jayesh Gandhi, Sunidhi Chauhan
"O Maahive Re O Maahive" - Alka Yagnik, Udit Narayan
"O Soni Re O Sayyoni Re" - K. K., Sapna Mukherjee
"Anjaane" - Kunal Ganjawala
"Mummy Cool Cool" - Baby Mohini Roy, Master Sohail

References

External links 
 

Hindi-language horror films
Indian ghost films
2005 films
2000s Hindi-language films
Films scored by Himesh Reshammiya
Hindi remakes of English films
Indian remakes of Spanish films